Heimahe Township (Mandarin: 黑马河镇) is a township in Gonghe County, Hainan Tibetan Autonomous Prefecture, Qinghai, China. In 2010, Heimahe Township had a total population of 5,163: 2,576 males and 2,587 females: 1,405 aged under 14, 3,527 aged between 15 and 65 and 231 aged over 65.

References 

Township-level divisions of Qinghai
Hainan Tibetan Autonomous Prefecture